The 2012 Hart District Council election took place on 3 May 2012 to elect members of the Hart District Council in England. This was the same day as other 2012 United Kingdom local elections.

Ward results

Blackwater and Hawley

Church Crookham East

Crondall

Fleet Central

Fleet Courtmoor

Fleet Pondtail

Fleet West

Hook

Odiham

Yateley East

Yateley West

References

2012 English local elections
2012
2010s in Hampshire